Pseudothyretes nigrita is a moth in the subfamily Arctiinae. It was described by Sergius G. Kiriakoff in 1961. It is found in the Democratic Republic of the Congo, Equatorial Guinea, Ghana and Kenya.

References

Moths described in 1961
Syntomini